Benji Lovitt, is an Israeli-American comedian, educator and writer.

Biography
Benjamin (Benji) Lovitt was born in Dallas, Texas, attended J.J. Pearce High School, and earned a Bachelor of Arts in Psychology degree from The University of Texas at Austin.

Lovitt visited Israel for the first time when he was 15 years old as part of a Young Judaea trip, and he returned a few years later to spend a gap year before college as a participant on Young Judaea's Year Course program. He made aliyah in 2006, in the midst of the Second Lebanon War, and began writing about his experiences in a blog called "What War Zone???" He currently lives in Tel Aviv.

Stand-up career
Lovitt first appeared  at an open-mic night in Houston, Texas in 1997. After making aliyah in 2006, Lovitt began performing professionally and has appeared in North America for synagogues, Hillel International, Jewish Community Centers, Israel Bonds, and the Jewish Federations of North America, and in Israel for Nefesh B'Nefesh, the Jewish Agency for Israel, Birthright Israel, Masa Israel Journey, the Israel Scouts, and community missions.

During Operation Protective Edge in the summer of 2014, Lovitt performed together with other comedians for Israeli civilians confined to bomb shelters or otherwise impacted by rockets launched by terrorists and for Israeli soldiers. While many of the shows were free, the proceeds from those with an admission charge were donated to the Friends of the IDF's Lone Soldier Program .

Lovitt also produced humorous videos on Jewish holidays, aliyah and other topics. He has been interviewed on the Israeli television show Hayom l'Machar and appeared as a featured bachelor on the Israeli reality dating show Singles.

Journalism career 
Lovitt has been widely published in Israeli and American media. He is a regular blogger for the Times of Israel and previously provided guest columns for The Jerusalem Post. Articles by Lovitt can also be found at eJewish Philanthropy, the Jewish Daily Forward, Ynet, Israel21c, PresenTense Magazine, Jewish Boston and other online publications.

Lovitt's annual column "Things I love about Israel" Yom Ha'atzmaut highlight the unique aspects of Israeli society from the perspective of an oleh.

Lovitt's January 2014 article in eJewish Philanthropy about bringing short-term Israel program participants to Tel Aviv was one of the site's most widely read and discussed pieces and is often credited with inspiring Birthright Israel to launch the Tel Aviv Urban Experience in 2015.

References

External links
 BenjiLovitt.com (Official Website)
 Lovitt Loves Israel ("Things I Love About Israel" Lists (from 2012 to 2016)
 67 More Things I Love About Israel (2015 List)
 Benji Lovitt on Bulgarian TV Show "Panorama"
 Stand-Up Routine for Tribute to Israeli Scout Caravan
 Channel 2 Interview of Benji Lovitt regarding Nefesh b'Nefesh Conference
 Spotlight Interview by Jewcer
 Voice of Israel Interview of Benji Lovitt

Israeli male comedians
1974 births
Living people
People from Dallas
University of Texas at Austin people
American stand-up comedians
Writers from Texas
Comedians from Texas
21st-century American comedians